WRPR (90.3 FM) is a freeform campus radio station licensed to Mahwah, New Jersey and owned by Ramapo College. Its call letters were assigned on October 9, 1979, and it began broadcasting on July 7, 1980.

WRPR today can be heard on 90.3 FM in the Mahwah area, as well as on Ramapo College's closed circuit television system on channel 3 (campus events channel) and channel 10 (live video feed from the studio). To contact the station or chat with DJs, students and off-campus listeners send instant messages to the station via social media or call in.

References

External links
WRPR website

Mahwah, New Jersey
RPR
Radio stations established in 1980